Archibald Denny McKenzie (1 May 1863 – 1946) was a Scottish professional footballer who played as an inside forward for clubs including Clyde, Sunderland and West Bromwich Albion.

References

1863 births
1946 deaths
Footballers from Greenock
Scottish footballers
Association football inside forwards
Clyde F.C. players
Millwall F.C. players
Sunderland A.F.C. players
West Bromwich Albion F.C. players
Portsmouth F.C. players
Dumbarton F.C. players
English Football League players
Scottish Football League players
Date of death missing